The 2012 Ukrainian Football Amateur League season.

Teams

Returning
 FC Ternopil
 Arsenal Kharkiv

Debut 
List of teams that are debuting this season in the league.

Karpaty Kolomyia, Lehion Zhytomyr, FC Volodarka, Retro Vatutine, FC Tarutyne, Savinyon Tairove, Zhemchuzhina Yalta, Hvardiyets Hvardiyske, ITV Simferopol

Withdrawn
List of clubs that took part in last year competition, but chose not to participate in 2012 season:

 Arsenal Zhytomyr
 FC Sambir
 Avanhard Novohrad-Volynskyi
 Metalurh Malyn

 SC Korosten
 Dinaz Vyshhorod
 FC Putrivka

 Yednist-2 Plysky
 FC Lysychansk
 FC Popasna

Location map

First stage

Group 1

Group 2

Group 3

Finals

Group A

Group B

Championship match

References

External links
 Amateur League (2012). RSSSF.

Ukrainian Football Amateur League seasons
Amateur
Amateur